The 1964 San Diego State Aztecs football team represented San Diego State College during the 1964 NCAA College Division football season.

San Diego State competed in the California Collegiate Athletic Association (CCAA). The team was led by head coach Don Coryell, in his fourth year, and played home games at Aztec Bowl.

The Aztecs were nationally rated as high as number 2 in the AP Small College Football Poll, and finished the year ranked number 5.  They finished the season with eight wins and two losses (8–2, 4–1 CCAA). The offense averaged over 40 points a game, totaling 423 points during the season. The defense gave up less than 10 points in 9 of their games, giving up only 71 points in 10 games.

Schedule

Team players in the NFL/AFL
The following San Diego State players were selected in the 1965 NFL Draft.

The following San Diego State players were selected in the 1965 AFL Draft.

The following finished their San Diego State career in 1964, were not drafted, but played in the NFL/AFL.

Team awards

Notes

References

San Diego State
San Diego State Aztecs football seasons
San Diego State Aztecs football